Billy Masters may refer to:

 Billy Masters (columnist) (born 1969), American gossip columnist
 Billy Masters (American football) (born 1944), American football tight end
 Billy Rush Masters (1950–1981), American composer and rock guitarist